Ben or Benjamin Jackson may refer to:

Ben Jackson (musician) (born 1963), American guitarist from Crimson Glory
Ben Jackson (footballer, born 1985), English footballer
Ben Jackson (footballer, born 2001), English footballer
Ben Jackson (esports player) (born 1988), professional Halo 2 player
Ben Jackson (golfer) (born 1967), English golfer based in Australia
Ben Jackson (Doctor Who), a fictional character in Doctor Who
Benjamin Jackson (soldier) (1835–1915), sailor, farmer, and Civil War soldier
Benjamin Daydon Jackson (1846–1927), botanist and taxonomer